Deviant is a 2018, award-winning drama short film directed by Benjamin Howard and written by Howard and James Hall. The film stars Rudy Pankow in one of his early works, and has a supporting cast of Mike Burnell, Krystina Montemurro and Court Rutter.

Plot
In the 1960s, a sexually conflicted teenager escapes the tortures of electrotherapeutic conversion therapy to find hope and acceptance.

Cast
Rudy Pankow
Mike Burnell
Krystina Montemurro
Court Rutter

Production

The project is Howard's undergraduate capstone film made at San Diego State University in the spring of 2017. He said "Deviant takes a young teenager, whose sexual preference comes into direct conflict with his faith and family." In scouting locations for the church, members of the production visited numerous LGBT-friendly churches in the San Diego area.  Several turned down the production due to the script's mature themes.  The church sequences were eventually filmed at Kensington Community Church, in San Diego, CA.

Release

Deviant premiered on June 9, 2018 at Dances with Films. It went on to screen at Outfest, HollyShorts Film Festival, Cleveland International Film Festival, Nashville Film Festival, GI Film Festival San Diego and San Diego International Film Festival. The film was distributed by Omeleto on April 20, 2020.  It has amassed over a quarter-million views since its release online.

Reception
Before the film's festival premiere, Howard was recognized with an award for Best Directing at San Diego State's Emerging Filmmakers Showcase in the spring semester, 2017.  In 2019, Deviant received a Student Emmy Award at the Pacific Southwest Chapter for National Academy of Television Arts and Sciences.

The film received more than 20 awards and nominations over the year and a half it played on the festival circuit, including several for Pankow and Howard, for acting and directing, respectively. Howard used the film as part of his application to UCLA film school, and was admitted into the program in 2018.

Accolades

References

External links
 
 
 

2018 short films
American drama short films
Films shot in San Diego
Films set in San Diego
American LGBT-related short films
American teen LGBT-related films
2010s historical drama films
LGBT-related drama films
2018 drama films
Films set in the 1960s
Films about LGBT and religion
2010s English-language films
2010s American films
Juvenile sexuality in films
2010s teen drama films
American teen drama films
Films about conversion therapy
Films released on YouTube